Homoeosoma achroeella is a species of snout moth in the genus Homoeosoma. It was described by Émile Louis Ragonot in 1887, and is known from Kazakhstan and Turkey.

References

Moths described in 1887
Phycitini
Insects of Turkey